1139 Atami, provisional designation , is a stony asteroid and sizable Mars-crosser, as well as a synchronous binary system near the innermost region of the asteroid belt, approximately 9 kilometers in diameter. It was discovered on 1 December 1929, by Japanese astronomers Okuro Oikawa and Kazuo Kubokawa at the Tokyo Astronomical Observatory near Tokyo. It was named after the Japanese city of Atami. It has the lowest Minimum orbit intersection distance (MOID) to Mars of any asteroid as large as it, its orbit intersecting only 0.03 astronomical units from the planet.

Classification and orbit 

Atami is a Mars-crossing asteroid, a dynamically unstable group between the main belt and the near-Earth populations, crossing the orbit of Mars at 1.666 AU. It orbits the Sun at a distance of 1.5–2.4 AU once every 2 years and 9 months (993 days). Its orbit has an eccentricity of 0.26 and an inclination of 13° with respect to the ecliptic. The body's observation arc begins with its official discovery observation at Tokyo in 1929.

Physical characteristics

Spectral type 

Atami is a common stony S-type asteroid in both the Tholen and SMASS classification. It has also been characterized as a S-type by Pan-STARRS photometric survey.

Binary system 

Photometric and Arecibo echo spectra observations in 2005 confirmed a 5 kilometer satellite orbiting at least 15 kilometers from its primary. Due to the similar size of the primary and secondary the Minor Planet Center lists this as a binary companion.

Diameter and albedo 

According to the survey carried out by NASA's Wide-field Infrared Survey Explorer and its subsequent NEOWISE mission, Atami measures 8.24 kilometers in diameter and its surface has an albedo of 0.258, while the Collaborative Asteroid Lightcurve Link assumes a standard albedo for stony asteroids of 0.20 and calculates a diameter of 9.35 kilometers based on an absolute magnitude of 12.51.

This makes Atami one of the largest mid-sized Mars-crossing asteroids comparable with 1065 Amundsenia (9.75 km), 1474 Beira (8.73 km), 1011 Laodamia (7.5 km), 1727 Mette (est. 9 km), 1131 Porzia (7.13 km), 1235 Schorria (est. 9 km), 985 Rosina (8.18 km), 1310 Villigera (15.24 km) and 1468 Zomba (7 km), but far smaller than the largest members of this dynamical group, namely, 132 Aethra, 323 Brucia, 1508 Kemi, 2204 Lyyli and 512 Taurinensis, which are all larger than 20 kilometers in diameter.

Naming 

The minor planet was named after Atami, a Japanese city and harbor near Tokyo, Japan. The naming citation was first mentioned in The Names of the Minor Planets by Paul Herget in 1955.

Notes

References

External links 
 Asteroids with Satellites, Robert Johnston, johnstonsarchive.net
 Asteroid Lightcurve Database (LCDB), query form (info )
 Dictionary of Minor Planet Names, Google books
 Asteroids and comets rotation curves, CdR – Observatoire de Genève, Raoul Behrend
 Discovery Circumstances: Numbered Minor Planets (1)-(5000) – Minor Planet Center
 
 

001139
Discoveries by Okuro Oikawa
Named minor planets
001139
001139
001139
19291201